Oconee State Park is a state park located in the Blue Ridge Mountain region of South Carolina.  This 1165-acre (472 ha) park has several recreational opportunities to choose from. They include cabins, camping, fishing and boating in the two small lakes located on the park grounds, hiking on eight nature/hiking trails, and several picnic and meeting facilities.

The southern end of the Foothills Trail and the western end of the Oconee Passage of the Palmetto Trail are in Oconee State Park.

History
Oconee State Park was created by the Civilian Conservation Corps (CCC) in the 1930s.  This park was created during the Great Depression when Franklin D. Roosevelt put men to work in civilian works projects.  Some of the park buildings existing today were made by the CCC.

Fifteen cabins, the superintendent's residence and garage, several shelters, the swimming lake and bath house and several other structures were listed on the National Register of Historic Places in 2004.

See also 
 List of South Carolina state parks

References

External links 

 Oconee State Park Pictures and Map

State parks of South Carolina
State parks of the Appalachians
Protected areas of Oconee County, South Carolina
Civilian Conservation Corps in South Carolina
Buildings and structures in Oconee County, South Carolina
National Register of Historic Places in Oconee County, South Carolina
Historic districts on the National Register of Historic Places in South Carolina
1935 establishments in South Carolina
Protected areas established in 1935